Arrhenophanes is a genus of moths in the family Arrhenophanidae.

Species
 Arrhenophanes perspicilla (Stoll, 1790)
 Arrhenophanes volcanica Walsingham, 1913

External links
Family Arrhenophanidae

Arrhenophanidae

References